Bad Schallerbach is a municipality in the district of Grieskirchen in the Austrian state of Upper Austria.

Geography
Bad Schallerbach is located in the Hausruckviertel. About 14 percent of the municipality is forest, and 67 percent is farmland.

References

Cities and towns in Grieskirchen District
Spa towns in Austria